ASSET, or Aerothermodynamic Elastic Structural Systems Environmental Tests was an experimental US space project involving the testing of an uncrewed sub-scale reentry vehicle.

Development and testing
Begun in 1960, ASSET was originally designed to verify the superalloy heat shield of the X-20 Dyna-Soar prior to full-scale crewed flights. The vehicle's biconic shape and low delta wing were intended to represent Dyna-Soar's forward nose section, where the aerodynamic heating would be the most intense; in excess of an estimated 2200 °C (4000 °F) at the nose cap.
Following the X-20 program's cancellation in December 1963, completed ASSET vehicles were used in reentry heating and structural investigations with hopes that data gathered would be useful for the development of future space vehicles, such as the Space Shuttle.

Built by McDonnell, each vehicle was launched on a suborbital trajectory from Cape Canaveral's Pad 17B at speeds of up to 6000 m/s before making a water landing in the South Atlantic near Ascension Island. Originally, a Scout launch vehicle had been planned for the tests, but this was changed after a large surplus of Thor and Thor-Delta missiles (returned from deployment in the United Kingdom) became available.

Of the six vehicles built, only one was successfully recovered and is currently on display at the National Museum of the United States Air Force in Dayton, Ohio.

Flights

Specifications

Manoeuvring controls: Hydrogen-peroxide reaction control thrusters
Maximum Mach no.: M25
Downrange: 
Apogee: 
 Hypersonic L/D ratio: 1:1

Related content

Comparable aircraft

 Molniya BOR-4
 Martin X-23 PRIME

Winged Gemini

In the mid-1960s, McDonnell proposed a variant of the Gemini capsule that retained the original spacecraft's internal subsystems and crew compartment, but dispensed with the tail-first ballistic reentry, parachute recovery and water landing.

Instead, the vehicle would be heavily modified externally into an ASSET-like lifting-reentry configuration. Post-reentry, a pair of stowed swing-wings would be deployed, giving the spacecraft sufficient lift-to-drag ratio to make a piloted glide landing on a concrete runway using a skid-type landing gear (reinstated from the planned, but cancelled paraglider landing system), much like the Space Shuttle.

According to Mark Wade's Encyclopedia Astronautica, the intent seems to have been to field a crewed military spaceplane at a minimal cost following the cancellation of the Dyna-Soar program.

References

Glider aircraft
Lifting bodies
Spaceplanes
1960s United States experimental aircraft
Unmanned aerial vehicles of the United States